The women's 100m breaststroke SB7 event at the 2012 Summer Paralympics took place at the  London Aquatics Centre on 1 September. There were two heats; the swimmers with the eight fastest times advanced to the final.

Results

Heats
Competed from 11:52.

Heat 1

Heat 2

Final
Competed at 20:27.

 
Q = qualified for final. PR = Paralympic Record.  DSQ = Disqualified. DNS = Did not start.

References

Swimming at the 2012 Summer Paralympics
2012 in women's swimming